Jakub Malczewski (born 20 December 1974) is a Polish alpine skier. He competed in three events at the 1992 Winter Olympics.

References

1974 births
Living people
Polish male alpine skiers
Olympic alpine skiers of Poland
Alpine skiers at the 1992 Winter Olympics
Sportspeople from Zakopane
20th-century Polish people